Stipitocyphella is a fungal genus in the family Marasmiaceae. It is a monotypic genus, containing the single species Stipitocyphella keniensis, from Kenya.

See also

List of Marasmiaceae genera

References

Taxa described in 1998
Fungi of Africa
Marasmiaceae
Monotypic Agaricales genera